Music For Montserrat was a benefit concert held on 15 September 1997 at the Royal Albert Hall. The event was organised by Sir George Martin, former producer for The Beatles and founder of Associated Independent Recording, to raise funds for the Caribbean island of Montserrat after a major volcanic eruption by the Soufrière Hills volcano earlier that year.

The concert was arranged and produced by Martin, and starred many iconic British and American rock musicians such as Phil Collins, Ray Cooper, Carl Perkins, Jimmy Buffett, Mark Knopfler, Sting, Elton John, Eric Clapton, Paul McCartney, Midge Ure, Arrow and many more, all of whom had once recorded or produced on the island. A DVD was released with the most famous songs from the concert, such as "Your Song", "Layla", "Brothers in Arms", "Blue Suede Shoes", "Money for Nothing", "Yesterday", "Hey Jude", and "Message in a Bottle".

Proceeds from ticket sales and DVD copies went towards restoration and support of the island. The concert raised £1.5 million. Proceeds from the show and DVD were used for immediate relief and also helped fund the building of a new cultural centre in Montserrat. On its completion in 2006, George Martin gifted the centre to the local community, which is still in operation today.

Background 
The island of Montserrat is a British Overseas Territory, nicknamed the "Emerald Isle of the Caribbean" in British culture due to its resemblance to coastal areas of Ireland and history of Irish migration. 

In July 1979, George Martin's AIR Studios built 'AIR Montserrat', a recording studio situated on the west side of the island. The studio became a cultural attraction for the island and created a culture of rock and pop music, offering the technical facilities of its London counterpart studio, with the alternative of an exotic location for international bands. American country rock musician Jimmy Buffett named his album, Volcano, after the Soufrière Hills volcano at which the studio stood at the base of.

From the period from 1979 to 1989, over 70 albums were recorded in the studio, including Hot Hot Hot, Synchronicity and Brothers in Arms.

In September 1989, tropical cyclone Hurricane Hugo travelled across the north-eastern Caribbean region, affecting approximately 2 million people. By the time the storm hit the island it was classified as a Category 4 hurricane, was Montserrat's costliest hurricane on record, dismantling the power infrastructure of the island and destroying ninety percent of the buildings and structures. Amongst the damage done to the island's economy and structures, AIR studios Montserrat experienced extensive structural damage and most recording equipment was destroyed. With the closure of this facility, the tourism economy on the island was effectively wiped out

In referencing the forced closure of the studio, Martin said:"After ten great years of recording there the music business had changed...the moguls running the business no longer wanted their artists miles away, outside their control."

"That coincided with the devastation caused by the hurricane and sadly the studios had to close. The people of Montserrat are still very proud of the work that was done at AIR Studios, it's only fitting that we continue and support music development."In July 1995, the once dormant Soufrière Hills volcano became active and erupted after a three-year period of heightened seismic activity beneath the island. The eruption from the volcano destroyed most of the public infrastructure around the island, including its airport and shipping facilities, necessitating an evacuation of the southern part of the island. Following the devastation caused by the two years of volcanic activity, and given his past connection with the island and community, Martin began efforts to raise funds in order to support the island.

Organisation 

In the aftermath of the Soufrière Hills disaster, George Martin began to plan out means of which to raise funds for the Montserratian community, with the first major event being the 'Music for Montserrat' concert. Up until his death in 2016, Martin continued to devote resources towards the support of Montserrat and its community.

The concert was organised to be held at London's Royal Albert Hall, under the title of "Music for Montserrat, in aid of The Montserrat Foundation". According to Sir George Martin and Royal Albert Hall, Martin organised all musicians playing at the benefit concert to perform for free. 

4,500 tickets were sold for the event (Royal Albert Hall has a total audience capacity of 5,900), with all tickets sold out within one and half hours of the box office initial opening. Ticket pricing was between £25, £40 and £60.

Supporting the performing artists was a band and choir, both organised by Martin:

Band 
 Robbie McIntosh – guitar
 Phil Palmer – guitar
 Long John Gilding – bass guitar
 Ian Thomas – drums
 Paul Wickens – keyboard

Choir 

 London Community Gospel Choir

List of performances 
 Introduction
 Blue Suede Shoes – Carl Perkins
 Dancing with Tears in My Eyes – Midge Ure*
 Vienna – Midge Ure *
 In the Air Tonight – Phil Collins *
 Take Me Home – Phil Collins
 Hot Hot Hot – Arrow & His Band
 Volcano – Jimmy Buffett
 Going Home – Mark Knopfler *
 Brothers in Arms – Mark Knopfler
 Money for Nothing – Mark Knopfler
 Fields of Gold – Sting *
 Message in a Bottle – Sting
 Magic – Sting
 Your Song – Elton John
 Live Like Horses – Elton John
 Don't Let the Sun Go Down On Me – Elton John
 Broken Hearted – Eric Clapton
 Layla – Eric Clapton
 Same Old Blues – Eric Clapton
 Yesterday – Paul McCartney
 Golden Slumbers/Carry That Weight/The End – Paul McCartney
 Hey Jude – Paul McCartney
 Kansas City – Paul McCartney

Not on DVD*

Music for Montserrat recordings and versions 
The initial 1997 recording and broadcast was aired by SkyTV on a pay-per-view basis, to be later released in DVD format by Eagle Entertainment and Image Entertainment.

This DVD release was a condensed version of the live performance, featuring some of the most popular songs played during the concert.

Fundraising 
Fundraising was focused on revenues from:

 Box office ticket sales for live concert
 DVD sales of performances release in the following months
 TV and radio broadcasts of the concert

Ticket sales from the 15th September 1997 concert, television and radio appearances and DVD sales amounted to raising £1,500,000 for Sir George Martin's Montserrat Foundation. The use of these proceeds was for immediate short-term relief for the islanders whose homes had been destroyed, as well as to  fund a new cultural and community Montserrat Cultural Centre.

Sir George Martin has been quoted by both Sting and Paul McCartney as saying to press following the fundraising effort,"“I am delighted that we look set to raise so much money for the long-suffering people of Montserrat. I am very grateful to all the wonderful musicians who will perform in the concert. I’m going to Montserrat in the next few weeks to see for myself where the money raised should be spent to the best effect"

Legacy 
The funds raised by 'Music for Montserrat' went to immediate use in supporting the local Montserratian community in the reconstruction of homes, as well as the first funds towards the new Montserrat Cultural Centre.

Following from the concert and the public focus it brought to the devastation caused by the Soufrière Hills eruption, George Martin's next fundraising effort was the release of five hundred 'limited edition' lithographs, featuring his score for the iconic 1965 song "Yesterday" by the Beatles. Signed by both Sir George Martin and Sir Paul McCartney, the proceeds of this sale generated another US$1.4 million which went towards the cultural and community center. In total, the Montserrat Cultural Centre cost nearly US$3 million to construct.

The centre remains in use today, located in Little Bay to the north of the island, as a conference venue and multi-purpose performing arts centre.

Trivia 
For Carl Perkins, this was his last major live performance; he died just over four months later on 19 January 1998.

References

External links
 The Montserrat Cultural Centre

Montserratian culture
Concerts at the Royal Albert Hall
1997 in music
1997 in London
Benefit concerts in the United Kingdom